Mathurin Henrio (16 April 1929, in Baud – 10 February 1944, in Baud) was a young French resistance fighter who was shot dead by German soldiers for refusing to answer questions on the whereabouts of maquisards. At age fourteen, he is the youngest recipient of the Ordre de la Libération and a recipient of the Croix de guerre 1939-45.

References

External links
 Mathurin Henrio at the Order of the Liberation website 

1929 births
1944 deaths
People from Morbihan
French Resistance members
Companions of the Liberation
Recipients of the Croix de Guerre 1939–1945 (France)